The Harry S. Truman Historic District is a National Historic Landmark District encompassing sites closely associated with US President Harry S. Truman in Independence, Missouri.  It includes the Truman Home at 219 North Delaware, Truman's home for much of his adult life and now a centerpiece of the Harry S. Truman National Historic Site, and the Truman Presidential Library.  The district was listed on the National Register of Historic Places in 1971, and was designated a National Historic Landmark in 1974.  When first listed, the district included only the two buildings and a corridor joining them. It was substantially enlarged in 2011 to include more sites and the environment in which Truman operated while living in Independence.

History
Wallace House (also called the Truman Home), 219 North Delaware Street, Independence, Missouri, would be the home of Harry S. Truman, on-and-off, after his marriage to Bess Wallace, on June 28, 1919 until his death on December 26, 1972. Bess Truman's maternal grandfather, George Porterfield Gates, built the house over a period of years from 1867 to 1895.

Bess's mother, Madge Gates Wallace, wanted the couple to live there with her. Bess had lived with her mother after Bess's father, David Willock Wallace, committed suicide in 1903, both of them moving in with Madge's parents. Also in 1919, Harry was putting all of his money into the men's clothing store of Truman & Jacobson open at 104 West 12th St. in downtown Kansas City, so living at the Wallace home made good financial sense.

After the haberdashery failed, in 1922, Harry and Bess could not afford to move to a new home. So they would continue living there while Harry paid off the debts from the store. That same year he went into politics, and would eventually move to Washington, D.C. Whenever they came back to Missouri, the Wallace House was their home.

The Trumans' only child Mary Margaret was born in the home on February 17, 1924. The site also includes the two adjacent homes of Mrs. Truman's brothers, and, across Delaware Street, the home of the President's favorite aunt and cousins. Guided tours of the site are conducted, and a visitor's center is housed in a nearby historic firehouse.

After he retired in 1953, until the Truman Library was opened on July 6, 1957, the Wallace House was also his office.

Truman is one of the few Presidents who never owned a home. He would live with family members in his early life, then the Wallace House, rented apartments and houses in Washington (including 4701 Connecticut Avenue), Blair House (the official state visitors' residence), and the White House, but never a house that he had purchased.

See also
List of National Historic Landmarks in Missouri
National Register of Historic Places listings in Jackson County, Missouri

References

External links

Harry S. Truman National Historic Site

Presidential homes in the United States
National Historic Landmarks in Missouri
Monuments and memorials to Harry S. Truman
Truman family residences
Historic districts on the National Register of Historic Places in Missouri
National Register of Historic Places in Jackson County, Missouri
Independence, Missouri